Ronald Eugene "Ron" Raikes (March 11, 1943 – September 5, 2009) was a farmer and former Nebraska state senator from Lincoln, Nebraska in the Nebraska Legislature.

Personal life
He was born on March 11, 1943, in Lincoln, Nebraska and graduated from Ashland High School.  He was a member of FarmHouse Fraternity ('62) and graduated from Iowa State University in farm operations, University of California-Davis with a master's in agriculture business management and a Ph.D. in agriculture economics. He is a former member of the Nebraska Economic Forecasting Advisory Board and current member of the Nebraska Farm Business Association, Nebraska Agriculture Relations Council, Nebraska Land Improvement Contractors Association, and Agriculture Builders of Nebraska.

State legislature
He was appointed to the legislature on May 15, 1997 to  replace Jerome Warner, who had died.  He was elected in 1998 to represent the 25th Nebraska legislative district and reelected in 2000 and 2004.  He chaired the Education committee, sat on the Revenue committee, the Education Commission of the States, and Midwestern Higher Education Compact.

Death
Raikes was found under a piece of farming equipment, believed to be a hay grinder, at 10:36 PM on September 5, 2009 in Ashland, Nebraska. He was pronounced dead on the scene at 11:07 PM.

His death was described as an accident and the Saunders County Attorney ordered an autopsy on his body.

See also

 Nebraska Legislature

References

1943 births
2009 deaths
Nebraska state senators
Politicians from Lincoln, Nebraska
Accidental deaths in Nebraska
Farming accident deaths
20th-century American politicians
University of California, Davis alumni
People from Ashland, Nebraska